Pringle of Scotland Limited (Scottish Gaelic: Pringle na h-Alba), trading as Pringle of Scotland, is a Scottish fashion brand specialising in cashmere knitwear and holds the royal warrant as manufacturers of knitted garments. It is one of the world's oldest continually operating fashion companies. The company has its flagship stores in London's Mount Street, Edinburgh's George Street,  Shanghai, Beijing, and is sold by retailers in 20 countries.

History

Formation
Robert Pringle established Pringle of Scotland in 1815 in the Scottish Borders. Initially the company produced hosiery and underwear, and have been producing cashmere since 1870. Otto Weisz was appointed as the first full-time designer in the knitwear industry in 1934. The twinset and the ancient-Scottish Argyle adapted pattern were designed under Weisz's direction, which became popular with Jean Simmons, Brigitte Bardot and Grace Kelly.

Dawson International Plc

In 1967, Pringle of Scotland was acquired by Joseph Dawson (Holdings) Limited, who were later renamed Dawson International Plc. Throughout the 1980s and 1990s leisure and sportswear played a key role within the Pringle of Scotland brand with top British golf players including Nick Faldo and Colin Montgomerie being sponsored by the group. During the early to mid-1980s that Pringle become a household name on the football terraces and still holds a nostalgic place in the heart of the casual movement.

In 2000, the brand which was losing around £4.5m per annum was bought for £6m by Hong Kong-based S.C. Fang & Sons Company, Ltd. Pringle has headquarters in Hawick, Scotland and a design studio in London, England.

Management changes

In the new millennium, under the leadership of newly appointed chief executive Kim Winser formerly of Marks & Spencer,  Stuart Stockdale the company exhibited at London Fashion Week with new designs based on the company's trademark twinset and Argyle pattern.

In 2005, Winser and Stockdale left the company, and having so far invested over £35m Kenneth Fang handed over control to his children, Jean and Douglas Fang. By this stage sales had risen to almost £25m with losses running at around £8m due to the expansion.

After Clare Waight Keller was appointed the new Creative Director, 2007 saw the introduction of a luxury accessories range. In March 2011 ex-Balenciaga designer Alistair Carr was named as Design Director following the resignation of Keller.

2016–present

Fran Stringer was announced as the Womenswear Design Director in 2016 and Giuseppe Marretta joined as Menswear Design Director in 2019 

In 2019 there were collaborations with H&M worldwide (Pringle of Scotland X H&M) and skater brand Palace (Pringle of Scotland X Palace). In 2020 Pringle of Scotland celebrated its 205th anniversary.

References

External links
 Company website

Clothing companies of Scotland
Scottish brands
High fashion brands
British Royal Warrant holders
Hawick
Knitwear manufacturers
Manufacturing companies established in 1815
1815 establishments in Scotland
Companies based in Edinburgh
Cashmere wool